The Jiedu Bridge is a historic stone arch bridge over the Jilong River in , Keqiao District of Shaoxing, Zhejiang, China.

History
Jiedu Bridge was originally built in the Qing dynasty (1644–1911). On 6 May 2013, it was listed among the seventh batch of "Major National Historical and Cultural Sites in Zhejiang" by the State Council of China.

Gallery

References

Shaoxing
Bridges in Zhejiang
Arch bridges in China
Qing dynasty architecture
Major National Historical and Cultural Sites in Zhejiang